Hakim Ziyech (born 19 March 1993) is a professional footballer who plays as an attacking midfielder or winger for Premier League club Chelsea and the Morocco national team. He is nicknamed "The Wizard", a title given to him by his former club Ajax supporters.

Ziyech started his professional career at Dutch club Heerenveen in 2012 and signed for fellow Dutch club Twente two years later. In 2016, he signed for Ajax on a five-year deal, with a reported transfer fee of €11m. The 2018–19 season was the most prolific season in Ziyech's career, as he scored 16 goals and provided 13 assists in the Eredivisie. He joined Premier League club Chelsea in the 2020–21 season.

Originally eligible to play for the Netherlands or Morocco at international level, he represented Morocco at the 2018 FIFA World Cup, 2019 Africa Cup of Nations and 2022 FIFA World Cup.

Ziyech is known for his finishing, dribbling, long passes, technique, and ability from free kicks. In 2019, he was selected as one of the 20 best players in the UEFA Champions League for the 2018–19 season. At the end of the same year, he was ranked 29th in The Guardians list of "The 100 best footballers in the world".

Beginning in 2015 when Ziyech joined the national team, he has donated all attained earnings and bonuses from international play to various charities or to the staff of the team.

Early life

Ziyech was born in Dronten, Flevoland, the youngest sibling of nine children (five boys and four girls) of Moroccan immigrants from Tafoughalt, a Berber village of the warrior tribal confederation of Aït Iznassen located near Berkane in northeastern Morocco. Ziyech grew up in the southern part of Dronten. His two older brothers Faouzi and Hicham were born in Berkane. Like many Moroccans between the 1960s and 1990s, a large number of people from northern Morocco emigrated to Belgium and the Netherlands in search of work and better living conditions. This was also the case for Hakim Ziyech's father who left Morocco in 1967 with his two sons Faouzi and Hicham for the Netherlands where he worked in a metal factory. Ziyech's mother joined her husband in the Netherlands at the age of eighteen and stayed at home and took care of the children in Dronten. Hakim has double nationality: Dutch and Moroccan. With his brothers and his friends from the neighborhood, Ziyech spent hours playing football on the Cruyff Court esplanade opposite his home. Learning his first skill moves there, football quickly became a passion. During his childhood, Ziyech regularly watched Ajax stars on television such as Wesley Sneijder, Zlatan Ibrahimović and Rafael van der Vaart. "There were a few players I loved watching, like Ronaldinho and Zinedine Zidane ...players of that caliber. I watched them a lot when I was little. I remember when I was ten years old, I watched their videos on YouTube every day", he said in an interview with UEFA in 2019.

Two of his brothers enrolled in the academies of PEC Zwolle and Heerenveen in the 1990s. As for Ziyech, aged seven, he asked his father to enroll him at a football club in order to practice his favorite sport. In 2001, he started playing football for his hometown club, Reaal Dronten. At Reaal Dronten, he met Aziz Doufikar who was part of the club staff, and the first Moroccan national to make an appearance in the Eredivisie. According to Ziyech, Doufikar would go on to become a great source of motivation to embark on a football career. In his neighborhood, Ziyech often went to the local youth center De Meerpaal to meet his friends and Doufikar, who was also an educator at the center. During this time, Ziyech has told that football was a dominant part of his life: "I went to school half an hour earlier every day with the ball in my hand. During lunch break, I played football. Once at home, I drank, I ate and I went outside again to play football... whenever I nutmegged a big kid, the whole neighbourhood would start screaming. In my life, I have fortunately made the right choices. I had to sort through a lot of my friends who were going adrift. In the end, my real training took place in the neighbourhood". Uninterested in school, Ziyech only devoted himself to football and the streets. 

On 23 December 2003, only ten years old, he suffered a great personal trauma, witnessing the death of his father, with whom he had a close relationship. His father, Mohamed Ziyech had suffered from a neuromuscular disease for several months. This event pushed him into youth crime. He thus grew up with his mother, who was forced to educate her eight children using family allowances and unemployment benefits in order to provide for the needs of the eight children. Ziyech would see two of his brothers return to prison for burglary. They were therefore dismissed from their respective clubs and decided to retire from football at an early age. One of the two brothers, Faouzi Ziyech has since stated: "Our last hope in the family was Hakim. Fortunately, he was able to quickly realise what was wrong, having four brothers who went down the wrong path". As for Hakim Ziyech, he was demotivated at the age of twelve and decided to put an end to football.

Club career

Heerenveen

2007–2012: Youth and early career
Under the guidance of Aziz Doufikar, Ziyech would return to football, progressing through the youth teams of Reaal Dronten and later ASV Dronten. He was also motivated by his older brother Faouzi to continue playing football and not to be discouraged. At the age of fourteen, he made his first return to Morocco to visit his father's grave. On his return to the Netherlands, he was invited on trials with professional clubs SC Heerenveen and Ajax. After impressing the Heerenveen scouts, he left his home in Dronten to be placed with a foster family in the town of Heerenveen, Friesland, where he joined the SC Heerenveen academy. Ajax had found Ziyech too small to progress in their academy. Once settled in at Heerenveen, he lived a turbulent life marked by delinquency, alcohol and drug problems, and he dropped out of school at age sixteen. Despite a good relationship with his foster family, who are of Armenian origin "he regularly comes home very late, sometimes drunk," says Doufikar.

2012–2014: First team
In 2007, Ziyech joined the Heerenveen academy.

On 2 August 2012, Ziyech made his formal debut for Heerenveen in the first leg of the third qualifying round of the Europa League, against Rapid București, playing a total of 53 minutes before being substituted. He made his Eredivisie debut for the club on 10 August, in a 0–2 loss to NEC. Ziyech scored his first goal for Heerenveen in a 2–0 win over NAC Breda, on 10 August 2013. On 23 August, Ziyech provided two assists in a 3–3 draw with Ajax. On 8 November, Ziyech scored and provided an assist in a 5–2 win over Waalwijk. On 18 December, Ziyech scored two goals against AZ Alkmaar, in the fourth round of the KNVB Cup, one in regular time and a last-minute penalty to draw level and take the game into a penalty shootout, but he missed his penalty and Heerenveen were knocked out 6–5 on penalties. On 21 December, Ziyech scored twice and provided one assist in a 5–1 away win over AZ Alkmaar. On 18 January 2014, Ziyech scored in a 2–2 draw with Roda. On 9 February, he scored in a 3–1 win over Groningen. On 27 April, Ziyech scored once and provided an assist in a 4–1 win over Utrecht, after coming on as a substitute.

Twente
On 18 August 2014, Ziyech joined Twente for €3.5m, signing on a three-year contract and taking the number 10 shirt. On 5 October, Ziyech scored once and provided an assist in a 2–2 draw with AZ Alkmaar. On 6 March 2015, Ziyech scored twice in a 2–2 draw with Willem II. On 10 May, he provided three assists in a 3–0 home win over Dordrecht. On 17 May, Ziyech scored twice and provided an assist in a 3–1 away win over his former club Heerenveen. Ziyech finished the season with 11 goals and 15 assists in the Eredivisie. For the 2015–16 season, Ziyech was selected as captain of the club; however, he was stripped of the captaincy in early January 2016, after he made disrespectful comments against the club and publicly requesting a transfer. The 2015–16 season was the most prolific season in Ziyech's career, as he scored 17 goals and provided 10 assist in the Eredivisie.

Ajax

2016–2018: Initial seasons and European final
On 30 August 2016, Ziyech signed for Ajax on a five-year deal, with a reported transfer of €11m. On 15 September, Ziyech was given a red card in the 79th minute, in a 2–1 win over Panathinaikos in the opening group game of the Europa League. Six days later, on 21 September, he scored his first goal for Ajax in a 5–0 win over Willem II in the KNVB Cup. On 2 October, Ziyech scored his first league goal for the club in a 3–2 win over Utrecht. On 20 October, he scored in a 2–2 draw with Celta Vigo in the Europa League. On 20 October, he scored in a 1–0 win over Excelsior. On 3 November, Ziyech scored in the reverse fixture against Celta Vigo in the Europa League, a 3–2 win. On 4 December, he scored a penalty in a 2–0 win over Groningen. On 15 January 2017, Ziyech scored twice in a 3–1 away win over Zwolle. On 29 January, he scored in a 3–0 win over Den Haag. On 8 April, he scored in a 5–1 away win over NEC.

On 12 August 2017, Ziyech scored the opening goal in a 1–2 defeat to Heracles Almelo. On 20 August, Ziyech scored in a 3–1 win over Groningen. On 9 September, Ziyech missed a penalty but eventually scored just five minutes later in a 3–0 win over Zwolle. On 18 November, Ziyech provided an assist in an 8–0 win over NAC Breda. On 26 November, he provided an assist in a 5–1 win over Roda. On 14 December, Ziyech scored in a 3–1 win over Excelsior. On 20 December, Ziyech missed a penalty against his former club Twente, in the round of sixteen of the KNVB Cup, with Ajax suffering elimination after losing the penalty shootout. On 4 February 2018, Ziyech scored an injury-time goal in a 3–1 win over NAC Breda. Three days later, on 7 February, he scored in a 4–2 away win over Roda. On 18 March, Ziyech scored twice in a 5–2 away win over Sparta Rotterdam. On 19 April, Ziyech scored in a 4–1 win over Venlo.

2018–2020: Domestic double and departure
On 25 July 2018, Ziyech scored in a 2–0 win over Sturm Graz in the second qualifying round of the UEFA Champions League. On 22 August 2018, Ziyech scored in a 3–1 win over Dynamo Kyiv in the play-off round of the UEFA Champions League. On 13 February 2019, he scored his first Champions League goal, scoring the equaliser in a 1–2 loss against Real Madrid in the round of 16. On 5 March 2019, he scored again in the 4–1 victory over Real Madrid in the second leg, which saw the title holders being knocked out and bringing Ajax to the quarter-finals, where they eliminated Juventus to reach the semi–finals of the competition.

On 30 April 2019, Ziyech assisted for the only goal in the Champions League semi–final first leg win at Tottenham Hotspur. He also scored the second goal for Ajax in the second leg of the semi-final, where Ajax were beaten 3–2 by Tottenham and were knocked out of the tournament on away goals with a 3–3 aggregate score. In August 2019, he signed a new three-year contract with Ajax.

In the 2019–20 UEFA Champions League group stage, Ziyech scored one goal each in a 3–0 away win against Valencia, and in a 2–0 away win over Lille. However, Ajax lost 1–0 at home to Valencia to be eliminated at the group stage.

Chelsea

2020–21 season: European champion

On 14 February 2020, it was announced that Ajax and Chelsea had reached an agreement for the transfer of Ziyech for a fee of €40 million (potentially increasing to a maximum of €44 million, with variable factors). He joined the Premier League club for the 2020–21 season. Ten days later, Chelsea announced they had agreed personal terms with Ziyech and that he had signed a five-year contract.

Ziyech made his league debut for Chelsea on 17 October 2020, in a 3–3 home draw against Southampton after he came off from the bench. On 28 October 2020, he scored his first Chelsea goal in a 4–0 away win over Krasnodar on matchday two of the Champions League. Three days later, Ziyech started his first league match for Chelsea, contributing with a goal and an assist in a 3–0 away win over Burnley. In doing so, Ziyech became the first Chelsea player since Diego Costa to score in his first two starts for Chelsea in all competitions. In Chelsea's next league match, Ziyech provided two assists and was named the man of the match as Chelsea defeated Sheffield United by a score of 4–1.

On 17 April 2021, Ziyech scored the only goal in Chelsea's FA Cup semi-final clash against Manchester City. On 29 May 2021, Ziyech won the 2021 UEFA Champions League Final with Chelsea 1-0 against Manchester City, but did not come off the bench in the match. Ziyech started ten matches and scored two goals in Chelsea's run to the final of the competition, including one against Atlético Madrid in the Round of 16 second leg at Stamford Bridge.

2021–22 season: UEFA Super Cup and FIFA Club World Cup titles
On 11 August 2021, Ziyech scored against Villarreal to give Chelsea their first UEFA Super Cup in 23 years, as they won on penalties. Ziyech was subbed off shortly before half-time with his arm in a sling after challenging for a header inside his own penalty area and landing badly. On 18 January 2022, Ziyech scored in a 1–1 draw against Brighton. On 23 January, Ziyech scored a wonderful curling shot against Tottenham Hotspur in a 2–0 victory.

On 12 February 2022, Ziyech was an extra-time substitute as Chelsea won the 2021 FIFA Club World Cup title.

International career

Netherlands
Born in the Netherlands to a Moroccan family, Ziyech was eligible to play for either Netherlands or Morocco national team at international level. He played for Dutch national youth teams, playing for the under-19, under-20 and under-21 squads. However, he opted to play for Morocco at senior level. He received his first call-up to the senior squad in May 2015 for friendly matches against the United States and Latvia.

Morocco

In September 2015, Ziyech confirmed his choice to represent Morocco on the international stage. Ziyech made his debut for the national team on 9 October, in a 1–0 defeat to the Ivory Coast. On 27 May 2016, he scored his first two goals for Morocco, in a 2–0 win over Congo. On 4 September, Ziyech scored in a 2–0 win over São Tomé and Príncipe in a 2017 Africa Cup of Nations qualifying match. Ziyech was not selected for the final 23-man squad for the 2017 Africa Cup of Nations.

On 1 September 2017, Ziyech scored in a 6–0 win over Mali, in a qualifying match for the 2018 FIFA World Cup. He was selected for the final 23-man squad for the 2018 FIFA World Cup. In September 2021, Ziyech was omitted from the national team squad due to a "poor attitude", having previously refused to play, citing an injury. Manager Vahid Halilhodžić said, "For the first time in my coaching career, I saw a national team player who doesn’t want to train and claims to be injured, although tests have shown he can play. I won't tolerate it". Ziyech was then also left out of Morocco’s 2021 Africa Cup of Nations squad.

On 8 February 2022, Ziyech announced his retirement from international football at the age of 28, having fallen out with Halilhodžić over his claims of Ziyech feigning injury. On 13 March 2022, Ziyech and his Moroccan teammate Noussair Mazraoui, both rejected Halilhodžić's invitation to represent the Morocco national football team in the 2022 FIFA World Cup qualification – CAF Third Round against DR Congo, and reaffirmed his decision to retire internationally. With Halilhodžić's sacking and appointment of Walid Regragui, Ziyech rescinded his resignation and rejoined the national team for the friendly against Chile on 23 September.

Ziyech speaks Dutch and English. He is not fluent in Darija; for this reason he addresses Moroccan fans and journalists in English.

Style of play
Ziyech is a right winger who likes to take up a wide starting position and then drive infield with the ball, on to his stronger left foot and into positions where he poses a threat on goal, either with shots, through balls or crosses. He is most dangerous coming into central areas and looking to play killer balls to teammates making diagonal runs towards goal from the left. He is particularly skilled at playing deft balls over a defence, and if his teammates time their runs well, they often very suddenly find themselves with a one-on-one shooting opportunity. His movement off the flank means the right-back can overlap.

The dip with which Ziyech plays those balls into the area is one of his greatest skills, not only because he so often creates clear-cut chances for his teammate, but also because he teases the opposition goalkeeper with a ball that looks like it might float through to them but drops short into the zone in front of goal. Ziyech can manipulate the ball impressively, and that leads to him creating plenty of chances for his team. He has incredible balance, speed and acceleration, is able to shake off the attention of an opponent with ease and create himself shooting opportunities, rather than going down the line to cross.

The threat he poses when he moves infield means he draws defenders towards him, creating gaps for others further forwards. That also works the other way around; teammates know that when Ziyech moves towards goal they should make runs that take defenders away and create space for him to shoot. When he does get into a position to shoot from range, he usually looks to bend his foot around the ball and aim for the far corner.

Career statistics

Club

International

Morocco score listed first, score column indicates score after each Ziyech goal.

Honours
Ajax
Eredivisie: 2018–19
KNVB Cup: 2018–19 
Johan Cruyff Shield: 2019
UEFA Europa League runner-up: 2016–17

Chelsea
UEFA Champions League: 2020–21
UEFA Super Cup: 2021
FIFA Club World Cup: 2021
FA Cup runner-up: 2020–21, 2021–22
EFL Cup runner-up: 2021–22

Individual
Mars d'Or (Moroccan Player of the Year): 2016
Lion d'Or African Footballer of the Year: 2018
Eredivisie Team of the Year: 2015–16, 2016–17, 2017–18, 2018–19
Eredivisie Best Player: 2015–16, 2017–18, 2018–19
SC Heerenveen Player of the Year: 2013–14
FC Twente Player of the Year: 2014–15
AFC Ajax Player of the Year: 2017–18, 2018–19, 2019–20
AFC Ajax Goal of the Season: 2019–20
Dutch Footballer of the Year: 2017–18
Eredivisie Player of the Month: October 2018, August 2019
UEFA Champions League Squad of the Season: 2018–19
CAF Team of the Year: 2019
IFFHS CAF Men Team of The Year: 2020
France Football Africa Team of the Year: 2018, 2019, 2020
Goal Africa Team of the Year: 2017, 2018, 2019
FA Cup Team of the Year: 2020–21

Notes

References

Works cited

External links

Profile at the Chelsea F.C. website
Hakim Ziyech at Voetbal International 

1993 births
Living people
Footballers from Dronten
Moroccan footballers
Dutch footballers
Association football midfielders
Association football wingers
SC Heerenveen players
FC Twente players
AFC Ajax players
Chelsea F.C. players
Eredivisie players
Premier League players
FA Cup Final players
UEFA Champions League winning players
Netherlands youth international footballers
Netherlands under-21 international footballers
Morocco international footballers
2018 FIFA World Cup players
2019 Africa Cup of Nations players
2022 FIFA World Cup players
Moroccan expatriate footballers
Dutch expatriate footballers
Expatriate footballers in England
Moroccan expatriate sportspeople in England
Dutch expatriate sportspeople in England